Kim Mi-yeon (born October 20, 1979) is a South Korean curler. She was the skip of the South Korean National Women's Curling Team at the 2002 and 2009 World Curling Championships.

Career
Kim skipped the Korean team to a Pacific Curling Championships gold medal in 2001, earning the Korean team their first ever appearance at the World Curling Championships. At the 2002 Worlds, the team finished last and without a single win, going 0-9.

Kim had a successful 2008–09 season which began with a Strauss Crown of Curling victory in October, and a silver medal at the Pacific Championships. They would play in the 2009 Mount Titlis World Women's Curling Championship as the host team, finishing this time with a 3–8 record.

References 

1979 births
Living people
South Korean female curlers
Asian Games medalists in curling
Curlers at the 2003 Asian Winter Games
Medalists at the 2003 Asian Winter Games
Asian Games silver medalists for South Korea